Vagónka is a Slovak railway coach and shipping containers maker and repairer. Its headquarters is in Trebisov.

External links
Vagónka a.s. Trebišov website

Companies of Slovakia
Slovak brands